Peter Van Vliet (died July 3, 1876) was an American farmer and Wisconsin pioneer.  He served one year in the Wisconsin State Assembly, representing Racine County as a member of the Free Soil Party. He was also a member of the Racine County Board of Supervisors.

Biography 
Van Vliet was elected in 1841 to the first board of supervisors for Racine County, which met in 1842.

He was elected to the 1851 session of the Wisconsin State Assembly as a Free Soiler.  He represented Racine County's 2nd Assembly district, at the time composed of the towns of Caledonia, Mount Pleasant, Norway, and Raymond, succeeding fellow Free Soiler Stephen O. Bennett.  He was succeeded in the 1852 session by Whig Abraham Gordon.

In June 1851, Van Vliet was appointed by the Racine County Agricultural Society as a judge for competitions in the upcoming Racine County fair, in the categories of best fields of Indian corn, winter wheat, spring wheat, and oats. In 1854, Van Vliet represented Caledonia on the executive committee of the society.

In his later years, Van Vliet resided in Lake City, Minnesota.  In 1876, he returned briefly to Racine to visit friends.  While there, he had a medical operation to lance a carbuncle on his neck.  The carbuncle later reopened and bled.  Van Vliet died from loss of blood on July 3, 1876.

References 

Farmers from Wisconsin
County supervisors in Wisconsin
Members of the Wisconsin State Assembly
People from Caledonia, Wisconsin
Wisconsin Free Soilers
19th-century American politicians